Methyl-CpG-binding domain protein 3 is a protein that in humans is encoded by the MBD3 gene.

Function 

DNA methylation is the major modification of eukaryotic genomes and plays an essential role in mammalian development. Human proteins MECP2, MBD1, MBD2, MBD3, and MBD4 comprise a family of nuclear proteins related by the presence in each of a methyl-CpG binding domain (MBD). However, unlike the other family members, MBD3 is not capable of binding to methylated DNA but instead binds to hydroxymethylated DNA. The predicted MBD3 protein shares 71% and 94% identity with MBD2 (isoform 1) and mouse Mbd3.  MBD3 is a subunit of the NuRD, a multisubunit complex containing nucleosome remodeling and histone deacetylase activities. MBD3 mediates the association of metastasis-associated protein 2 (MTA2) with the core histone deacetylase complex.

MBD3 also contains the coiled‐coil domain common to all three MBD3 isoforms. The coiled‐coil domain, but not the MBD domain, helps to maintain pluripotency of embryonic stem cells via the recruitment of polycomb repressive complex 2 to a subset of genes linked to development and organogenesis, thus establishing stable transcriptional repression.

Interactions 

MBD3 has been shown to interact with:
 AURKA, 
 GATAD2B,
 HDAC1, 
 MTA2, and
 MBD2.

References

Further reading 

 
 
 
 
 
 
 
 
 
 
 
 
 
 
 
 

Human proteins